Obiedzino  is a village in the administrative district of Gmina Kolno, within Kolno County, Podlaskie Voivodeship, in north-eastern Poland.

The village has a population of 148 and its geographical coordinates are 53°24′N 22°1′E.

References

Obiedzino